Honor Up is a 2018 action film directed and co-written by Damon Dash and produced by Kanye West. Starring Dash, Cam'ron, Daniel Jenkins, Murda Mook, Nicholas Turturro and Stacey Dash, the film was released on February 16, 2018 to generally negative reviews.

Plot 
A drug lord becomes embroiled in a fierce fight to maintain his honor after a deadly gun attack in Manhattan's neighborhood of Harlem.

Cast 
 Damon Dash as OG/Narrator
 Cam'ron as JR
 Nicholas Turturro as Detective Kean
 Daniel Jenkins as Primo
 Murda Mook as Mike
 Stacey Dash as Tara
 Smoke DZA as Dee
 Smokey Suarez as Flip

Reception 
Los Angeles Times critic Michael Rechtshaffen stated: "A criminally inept throwback to '90s urban gangsta movie posturing that plays like a stone-faced version of the 1996 Wayans brothers spoof, Don't Be a Menace to South Central While Drinking Your Juice in the Hood". According to Glenn Kenny of The New York Times, the movie "sometimes manages to bring a scary whiff of the street into its sounds and images".

References

External links 

 

2018 films
2018 action films
Films directed by Damon Dash
2010s English-language films
American crime action films
Hood films
2010s American films